Ulrika "Ulla" Sofia Adlerfelt, née Sparre af Sundby (21 July 1736 – 1 August 1765), was a Swedish artist (painter) and noble. She was a member of the Royal Swedish Academy of Arts.

She was born in Stockholm, the daughter of Count Axel Sparre af Sundby and Augusta Thörnflycht and married to Baron Carl Adlerfelt. She was the student of Gustaf Lundberg. She drew, and painted in oil.  She died in Malmö.

References

 Svenskt konstnärslexikon (Swedish Art dictionary). Red. Johnny Roosval & Gösta Lilja. Malmö: Allhems Förlag 1952.

1736 births
1765 deaths
18th-century Swedish women artists
18th-century Swedish painters
Artists from Stockholm
Members of the Royal Swedish Academy of Arts
Swedish countesses
Age of Liberty people